Grampound with Creed is a civil parish in Cornwall, England, United Kingdom.

The two major settlements in the parish are the ancient town of Grampound and the smaller village of Creed.

Grampound With Creed is bordered by St Stephen-in-Brannel parish to the north, St Ewe parish to the east and Cuby parish to the south. On the west, the parish boundary follows the River Fal, which separates it from Probus parish. The population at the 2011 census was 682.

History
In medieval times, Creed was taxed as part of Tybesta, a manor mentioned in the Domesday Book under the name Tibesteu.

The parish has been in the Registration District of St Austell since 1837 and used to be in the St Austell Union for poor law parish relief. The population of Grampound with Creed parish was 638 in the 2001 census.

Churches

The ecclesiastical parish is in the Deanery and Hundred of Powder and in the Diocese of Truro. The parish church is in Creed village and is dedicated to St Crida. Much of the church is medieval, but the three-stage battlemented tower was added in 1733 and contains two medieval bells. The other Anglican church in the parish stands in Grampound and is dedicated to St Nun. There were also Wesleyan Methodist and Bible Christian chapels in Grampound.

References

External links

 Grampound with Creed Parish Council

Civil parishes in Cornwall